Kitō, Kito, Kitou or Kitoh (written: 鬼頭, 紀藤 or 木藤) is a Japanese surname. Notable people with the surname include:

, Japanese voice actress
, Japanese diarist
, Japanese manga artist
, Japanese lawyer
, Japanese manga artist

Japanese-language surnames